SMS Cöln has been the name of two ships of the German Imperial Navy:

 , a light cruiser sunk at the Battle of Heligoland Bight.
 , a light cruiser, the lead ship of her class, the last class of light cruisers of the German Imperial Navy.

The Reichsmarine and Kriegsmarine had a ship in service, . The Bundesmarine also has a ship currently in service, Köln.

German Navy ship names